San Cristoforo is a Baroque-style Roman Catholic church located on Rua d'Argillano in the town of Ascoli Piceno in the region of Marche, Italy.

History 
The church was begun as the oratory for the Confraternita della Buona Morte (Confraternity of the Good Death). A group often tending to those condemned to execution. It was reconstructed in 1593–98, at the site of a 14th-century church. The façade dates to 1603, but the church was not completed until 1790. The interior has three stucco altars by local architect Giuseppe Giosafatti. The church houses altarpieces by Ludovico Trasi, depicting the Miracle of San Nicola di Bari, and by  Nicola Antonio Monti, depicting the Souls in Purgatory.

References 

Baroque architecture in Marche
Roman Catholic churches in Ascoli Piceno
16th-century Roman Catholic church buildings in Italy
Roman Catholic churches completed in 1790